Howard Rachlin (1935–2021) was an American psychologist and the founder of teleological behaviorism. He is Emeritus Research Professor of Psychology, Department of Psychology at Stony Brook University in New York. His initial work was in the quantitative analysis of operant behavior in pigeons, on which he worked with William M. Baum, developing ideas from Richard Herrnstein's matching law.  He subsequently became one of the founders of Behavioral Economics.  His current research focuses on patterns of choice over time and how those patterns affect self-control (on which he worked with George Ainslie), including cooperation over time. His interests in Behavioral Economics include: decision making, the prisoner's dilemma, addiction, and  gambling. He was one of the first board members of the Society for Quantitative Analysis of Behavior.

References

External links

21st-century American psychologists
Behavioral economists
1935 births
2021 deaths
20th-century American psychologists